Sugar factory may refer to:

 Beet sugar factory, a factory that produces raw sugar from sugar beet and refines it
 Sugarcane mill, a factory that produces raw sugar from sugar cane and refines it
 Sugar refinery, a factory that produces white sugar from raw sugar